Nick James Mansfield (born 1959) is an Australian philosopher and Dean of Higher Degree Research at the Macquarie University. He is known for his research on subjectivity and sovereignty. Mansfield is one of the founding general editors of the journal Derrida Today.

Bibliography
 The God who Deconstructs Himself: Sovereignty and Subjectivity Between Freud, Bataille, and Derrida
 Subjectivity: Theories of the Self from Freud to Haraway
 Cultural Studies and Critical Theory
 Masochism: The Art of Power
 Theorizing war: From Hobbes to Badiou
 Subjectivity: a Theoretical Introduction

References

External links
 Nick Mansfield at the Macquarie University

21st-century Australian philosophers
20th-century Australian philosophers
University of Sydney alumni
Academic staff of Macquarie University
Continental philosophers
Living people
Derrida scholars
Philosophers of art
Political philosophers
Philosophy journal editors
1959 births